Sun over Sweden (Swedish: Sol över Sverige) is a 1938 Swedish comedy film directed by Arne Bornebusch and starring Nils Lundell, Rut Holm and Inga-Bodil Vetterlund. It was shot at the Sundbyberg Studios in Stockholm and on location across Sweden. The film's sets were designed by the art director Bibi Lindström. It is a remake of the 1936 Danish film Sun Over Denmark.

Synopsis
The film follows the adventures of a group of people travelling through Sweden, Nisse Lundin and his wife Rut on their honeymoon and the shop assistants Britta and Inga on a bicycling holiday.

Cast
 Nils Lundell as 	Nisse Lundin
 Rut Holm as 	Rut
 Greta Ericson as 	Britta
 Inga-Bodil Vetterlund as 	Inga Andersson 
 Carl Browallius as Reverend Lundgren 
 Nils Ericsson as Svante Linderholm
 Helge Hagerman as 	Bertil Lundgren
 Hugo Björne as 	Director S. Lundgren - Bertil's father
 Ragnar Falck as 	Kicke 
 Ludde Gentzel as 	Ludde
 Signe Wirff as Mrs. Andersson, Inga's mother 
 Max Linder as Caravan salesman
 Stig Johanson as 	Man outside shop
 Selma Lagerlöf as 	Self
 Verner von Heidenstam as 	Self

References

Bibliography 
 Bertil Wredlund & Rolf Lindfors. Långfilm i Sverige: 1930-1939. Proprius, 1983.

External links 
 

1938 films
Swedish comedy films
1938 comedy films
1930s Swedish-language films
Films directed by Arne Bornebusch
Films set in Sweden
Films shot in Sweden
Remakes of Danish films
1930s Swedish films